The British Rail Class 313 is a dual-voltage electric multiple unit (EMU) train built by British Rail Engineering Limited's Holgate Road carriage works between February 1976 and April 1977. They were the first production units that were derived from British Rail's 1971 prototype suburban EMU design which, as the BREL 1972 family, eventually encompassed 755 vehicles over five production classes (313, 314, 315, 507 and 508). They were the first second-generation EMUs to be constructed for British Rail and the first British Rail units with both a pantograph for  overhead lines and contact shoe equipment for  supply. They were, additionally, the first units in Britain to employ multi-function automatic Tightlock couplers, which include electrical and pneumatic connections allowing the coupling and uncoupling of units to be performed unassisted by the driver whilst in the cab.

The Class 313 units are the oldest EMUs on the National Rail network, at 46 years old; they entered service in 1976 However, the even-older 1972 Stock and 1973 Stock are still in service on London Underground.

Description
The Class 313 was developed following extensive trials with the prototype Class 445 "PEP" built in the early 1970s. The 313 is similar to the Class 314 (Glasgow), Class 315 (Anglia suburban — east London), Class 507 (Merseyside) and Class 508 (Merseyside, formerly Southern Region). The Class 313 directly replaced the Class 105 and 106 diesel multiple units previously on the Great Northern Inner Suburban services between London and Hertfordshire.

They are standard length and width, but the roof is lower, most noticeable due to the lack of a "well" for the Stone Faiveley AMBR pantograph on the centre coach. They have to comply with regulations for underground trains, such as having doors at each end of the train for evacuation onto the tracks, and when on 750 V DC supply the traction supply for each motor coach is separate, whereas on conventional 750 V DC trains each coach in a unit is linked by a 750 V bus line. Due to this, each motor coach has shoe gear on both bogies, whereas normally it would only be on the leading bogie. They are fitted with trip-cocks that are struck by a raised train-stop arm at red signals and will apply the brakes if the train passes one.

The units were originally numbered 313001–313064. Each unit is formed of two outer driving motors and an intermediate trailer with a pantograph. This is a reversal of the practice started in the 1960s, where the motors and pantograph were on an intermediate vehicle, with the outer vehicles being driving trailers. Part of the reason was to simplify the equipment to allow dual-voltage operation, and to keep down weight by spreading the heavy transformer and motors between vehicles. The intermediate trailer carries the pantograph and a transformer and rectifier, which on 25 kV AC provides 750 V DC to the motor coaches, each of which has four  GEC G310AZ direct current traction motors, two per bogie.  On 750 V DC each motor coach draws its supply directly through its shoe gear. The traction motors are driven by a camshaft-controlled resistance system with series and parallel motor groupings and weak field steps. Originally the heating in the motor coaches was provided by passing air over the hot traction and braking resistors in addition to conventional heaters, but this feature is no longer in use and the pneumatic dampers have been disabled. Great Northern and Southern retrofitted their units with cab air conditioning.

313s have rheostatic braking (which was disabled on London Overground) in addition to conventional three-step air-operated disc braking. During braking if wheelslide is detected by the Wheel slide protection (WSP), rheostatic braking is disabled and disc-braking only is used. Great Northern units had sanding equipment. Unlike some other DMU/EMU classes, additional brake force is not available when the emergency brake application is initiated and is the equivalent force of a step 3/full service application. WSP is still active when making an emergency application.

In addition to the primary suspension of rubber chevron spring and oil dampers, secondary suspension is provided by two air bellows per bogie - flow into each bellows is controlled independently by a levelling valve and arm assembly that allows the suspension to inflate/deflate when the weight of the coach is increased or decreased by passenger loading. The air suspension is linked to the braking system via a Variable Load Valve (VLV), which increases air brake pressure when the coach is more heavily loaded to compensate for the additional weight.

Vehicles are numbered as follows.
 62529–62592: DMSO (Driver's cab, Motor car, Standard class, Open saloon)
 71213–71276: PTSO (Pantograph, Trailer car, Standard class, Open saloon)
 62593–62656: BDMSO (Battery for auxiliaries, Driver's cab, Motor car, Standard class, Open saloon)
All units have standard class seating only.

As built, the sliding doors were opened by the passengers. Once the driver had stopped the train and the guard had activated the master door release, a passenger could move the door handle gently sideways which operated a switch controlling the individual door opening circuit. Many people did not wait for the guard's release and gave the handle a much harder tug, which could open the door even if the train had not stopped. Concerns over passenger safety led to the handles being replaced by push-buttons from March 1977.

Modifications led to renumbering and reclassification. All units originally had shoebeams on the inner bogie of each motor coach, which was sufficient for third-rail duties between Drayton Park and Moorgate. Some units became surplus, and in 1987 four were transferred to the Clacton/Walton route, which has no DC sections; they had the shoegear removed, and were renumbered from 313061–313064 to 313096–313099. Following an accident involving one unit at Walton-on-the-Naze in August 1987, they were replaced by  units in 1988. Units 313001–313016 had shoegear fitted to the outer bogies in addition, and were transferred to the Watford DC route where there are long gaps in the third rail. They were renumbered into a new 313/1 subclass, leaving the unmodified units in subclass 313/0.

Following the privatisation of British Rail, ownership of the Class 313 fleet passed to leasing company Eversholt Rail Group. In June 2012 Eversholt sold twenty units (313121 and the nineteen 313/2 units) to newly formed lessor Beacon Rail.

Operations

Current

Southern (Govia Thameslink Railway)

These units were repainted at Wolverton Works and renumbered from 313/1 into a new 313/2 subclass. The full refurbishment began in June 2010 at Wabtec Doncaster and included new flooring and carpet, new seating, improved space for cycles and passengers in wheelchairs, and the fitting of a Passenger Information System. Additional modifications were carried out at Stewarts Lane TMD including the installation of cab air-conditioning, sanding equipment, a 750 V busline, shore supply sockets and the removal of overhead line equipment.

The decision to use 313s on the Coastway lines has been controversial, as they are much older than the 377s and have fewer on-board passenger facilities. The rail union RMT criticised the move and many publications, including the BBC, have questioned the introduction of 35-year-old trains in place of much newer units. These trains are deployed on services that operate predominantly over short distances, such as Brighton to Hove and Brighton to Seaford, and some longer (but stopping) services that provide predominantly local links that run alongside 377s on faster services.

The introduction of 313s on the Coastway routes facilitated the delivery of additional capacity on high-demand suburban routes in South London, where 10-car trains services are to be introduced combined with platform lengthening.

In December 2017, it was announced that unit 313201—originally 313001, the first and oldest Class 313 unit—had been repainted into British Rail's Rail Blue livery, as originally used on the units (though, to meet today's accessibility requirements, the passenger doors were painted entirely grey rather than blue and grey as original). The repaint was part of the C6 overhaul, which included works on the doors, air system and interior, which includes new, modern LED lighting, and for bodywork repairs. The Director of Engineering for Beacon Rail, which owns the Class 313s, has said, "We wanted to celebrate the heritage of this special train, so the re-livery made perfect sense."

Former

Silverlink/London Overground

Silverlink inherited 23 units from British Rail. These were mainly operated under the Silverlink Metro brand on the North London, West London, and Watford DC lines, although they were also regularly used on the St Albans AbbeyWatford Junction branch line between 1988 and the end of the Silverlink franchise in 2007.

In 2007 they were used on services transferred to London Overground, which replaced Silverlink Metro. London Overground branding was added, and some seats were removed to provide additional standing room. They were replaced by Class 378 trains, with longitudinal seating to improve standing room.

The final day of scheduled 313 operation on the North and West London Lines was 19 February 2010, although units remained in use as ad-hoc substitutes for unavailable 378/0s. By August 2010 only 313121 and 313123 were still in service with London Overground, as the 378/2 Capitalstars were by then in use on the Watford DC Line. They last ran for London Overground on 13 September 2010.

West Anglia Great Northern/First Capital Connect/Great Northern (Govia Thameslink Railway) 

From 1 April 2006 the Great Northern (GN) franchise merged with Thameslink to form the Thameslink Great Northern franchise, which was won by FirstGroup and became known as First Capital Connect. Three Class 313/1 units were transferred to First Capital Connect from London Overground in September 2010 to augment the Class 313/0 fleet. They were repainted into FCC livery and lightly refreshed internally but retained their original low-backed seating. Despite receiving modifications that made them mechanically identical to the 313/0s, they were not renumbered. The units were then transferred to Great Northern on 14 September 2014 when the Thameslink and Great Northern franchise was merged into the Thameslink, Southern and Great Northern franchise.

Trains bound for Moorgate approach Drayton Park on a falling gradient, drawing power via the pantograph. After coming to a stand at the platform the driver opens the vacuum circuit breaker, lowers the pantograph and changes over to DC. Whilst at Drayton Park, the starting signal for the platform is held at danger until the pantograph is lowered. Unusually for dual voltage trains, on this stock and its replacement, the Class 717, a shunt resistor is permanently connected to the pantograph. The detection of the small current drawn holds the signal at danger while the pantograph remains in contact with the overhead wire. This current is very audible as it manifests itself as a distinct buzzing noise as an arc is struck and subsequently extinguished as the pantograph lowers. This prevents the driver from powering into the tunnel with the pantograph raised which would cause damage to the train as the pantograph ran off the end of the overhead line and struck the tunnel portal. On journeys from Moorgate traction power is maintained into Drayton Park for the rising gradient. Once the train is at a stand the driver selects AC traction and raises the pantograph. There is no system forcing the driver to change traction supplies beyond the customary 'PANS UP' sign at the end of the platform. If the driver forgets to change to AC no damage will occur to the train or any infrastructure; there will simply be a loss of power as the train runs out of third rail.

313134 was named "City of London" at Moorgate on 9 December 2010 by Michael Bear, the Lord Mayor of London.

The final Class 313 service on Great Northern was the 23:33 Hertford North to Moorgate on 30 September 2019. A final railtour, operating from London King's Cross to Royston (via Welwyn Garden City) and back (via Hertford North and Moorgate) was held on 23 October 2019 with units 313134 and 313064; the DMSO vehicle of 313064 was repainted in Network SouthEast livery.

Departmental use

Network Rail leased Beacon Rail-owned unit 313121 as a test vehicle for the European Rail Traffic Management System (ERTMS) installation on the Hertford Loop.

The unit was repainted into Network Rail's yellow house colours and internally refurbished at Alstom's Wembley Intercity Depot, to
include a new driving desk, technician's workstation, kitchen and toilet facilities, and the necessary ERTMS equipment. It commenced testing on the Hertford Loop later that month. Following conclusion of the Hertford Loop works, it was placed in store at Eastleigh Works in May 2018. It will be returned to service when ERTMS is ready for testing on the Great Western Main Line.

Replacement
The Great Northern fleet has been replaced by new six-carriage Class 717s. The transition commenced on 25 March 2019, with the first two 717s entering service.

The first of the Great Northern fleet withdrawn was 313026 in February 2019. It was the first dispatched for scrapping in April 2019. All 44 of the Great Northern 313s have since been withdrawn and scrapped.

The Southern Class 313 fleet is expected to be withdrawn at the May 2023 timetable change, though three units were to be sent for scrap by the end of January 2023. This was delayed until 10 March 2023, when units 313202, 313214, and 313217 were dispatched for scrap at Eastleigh Works.

The Railway Heritage Designation Advisory Board had originally designated unit 313201 for potential preservation after retirement, on the grounds that it was the first Class 313 unit built, and by extension the first production PEP-derived unit. However, in early 2023, the board decided instead to designate Network Rail's unit 313121, as unlike 313201 it retains its original seating and dual-voltage running equipment.

Accidents and incidents
 On 15 October 1986, unit 313012 ran into the rear of a London Underground empty stock train at  due to excessive speed after passing a signal at caution. Twenty-five people were injured.
Thirteen people were injured.
 On 22 October 2020, unit 313212 was derailed at  due to a signalling error.
 On 19 November 2020, unit 313220 was involved in a fire at  station.
 On 10 March 2021, unit 313203 was involved in a fire at  station.

Fleet details

Notes

References

Further reading

 

313
313
Train-related introductions in 1976
750 V DC multiple units
25 kV AC multiple units